Physical Review is a peer-reviewed scientific journal established in 1893 by Edward Nichols. It publishes original research as well as scientific and literature reviews on all aspects of physics. It is published by the American Physical Society (APS). The journal is in its third series, and is split in several sub-journals each covering a particular field of physics. It has a sister journal, Physical Review Letters, which publishes shorter articles of broader interest.

History 
Physical Review commenced publication in July 1893, organized by Cornell University professor Edward Nichols and helped by the new president of Cornell, J. Gould Schurman. The journal was managed and edited at Cornell in upstate New York from 1893 to 1913 by Nichols, Ernest Merritt, and Frederick Bedell. The 33 volumes published during this time constitute Physical Review Series I.

The American Physical Society (APS), founded in 1899, took over its publication in 1913 and started Physical Review Series II. The journal remained at Cornell under editor-in-chief G. S. Fulcher from 1913 to 1926, before relocating to the location of editor John Torrence Tate, Sr. at the University of Minnesota. In 1929, the APS started publishing Reviews of Modern Physics, a venue for longer review articles.

During the Great Depression, wealthy scientist Alfred Loomis anonymously paid the journal's fees for authors who could not afford them.

After Tate's death in 1950, the journals were managed on an interim basis still in Minnesota by E. L. Hill and J. William Buchta until Samuel Goudsmit and Simon Pasternack were appointed and the editorial office moved to Brookhaven National Laboratory on Eastern Long Island, New York. In July 1958, the sister journal Physical Review Letters was introduced to publish short articles of particularly broad interest, initially edited by George L. Trigg, who remained as editor until 1988.

In 1970, Physical Review split into sub-journals Physical Review A, B, C, and D. A fifth member of the family, Physical Review E, was introduced in 1993 to a large part to accommodate the huge amount of new research in nonlinear dynamics. Combined, these constitute Physical Review Series III.

The editorial office moved in 1980 to its present location across the expressway from Brookhaven National Laboratory. Goudsmit retired in 1974 and Pasternack in the mid-1970s. Past Editors in Chief include David Lazarus (1980–1990; University of Illinois at Urbana–Champaign), Benjamin Bederson (1990–1996; New York University), Martin Blume (1996–2007; Brookhaven National Laboratory), and Gene Sprouse (2007–2015; SUNY Stony Brook). The current Editor in Chief is Michael Thoennessen, whose term began in September 2017.

To celebrate the hundredth anniversary of the journal, a memoir was published jointly by the APS and AIP.

In 1998, the first issue of Physical Review Special Topics: Accelerators and Beams was published, and in 2005, Physical Review Special Topics: Physics Education Research was launched. In January 2016 the names of both journals were changed to remove "Special Topics". Physical Review also started an online magazine, Physical Review Focus, in 1998 to explain and provide historical context for selected articles from Physical Review and Physical Review Letters. This was merged into Physics in 2011. The Special Topics journals are open access; Physics Education Research requires page charges from the authors, but Accelerators and Beams does not. Though not fully open access, Physical Review Letters also requires an author page charge, although this is voluntary. The other journals require such a charge only if manuscripts are not prepared in one of the preferred formats. Since 2011, authors can pay an article processing charge to make their papers open access. Such papers are published under the terms of the Creative Commons Attribution 3.0 License (CC-BY). Physical Review Letters celebrated their 50th birthday in 2008. The APS has a copyright policy to permit the author to reuse parts of the published article in a derivative or new work, including on Wikipedia.

The APS has an online publication entitled Physics, aiming to help physicists and physics students to learn about new developments outside of their own subfield. This now includes the general-interest articles that appeared as Physical Review Focus. A short-lived journal, also called Physics, was published by Pergamon Press and Physics Publishing Co. from 1964 through 1968, with the goal of printing "a selection of papers which are worth the attention of all physicists." The four volumes of this journal were eventually made freely available online by the APS under the alternative title Physics Physique Физика, reflecting how the title was originally printed on the journal covers and how it was sometimes referred to in the years since.

It also publishes Physical Review X, an online-only open access journal. It is a peer-reviewed journal that publishes, as timely as possible, original research papers from all areas of pure, applied, and interdisciplinary physics. In 2014 Physical Review Applied began publishing research across all aspects of experimental and theoretical applications of physics, including their interactions with other sciences, engineering, and industry. In 2016 the APS launched Physical Review Fluids "to include additional areas of fluid dynamics research", and in 2017 it launched Physical Review Materials "to fill a gap" in the coverage of materials research. In 2019 Physical Review Research was launched to provide a broad fully open-access journal at about the same selectivity level as the older A - E journals. In 2020, PRX Quantum was launched to provide a home for and connection between the numerous research communities that make up quantum information science and technology, spanning from pure science to engineering to computer science and beyond.

Journals

See also
List of fluid mechanics journals

Notes

References

External links 
American Physical Society
Journals of the APS
APS online publication Physics
Online archive of all back issues of Physical Review (subscription required)

Index of freely available volumes
The term of copyright on volumes published before 1924 has expired. Most of these volumes are available online for free in their entirety:

 
 
 
 
 
 
 
 
 
 
 
 
 
 
 
 
 
 
 
 
 
 
 
 
 
 
 
 
 
 
 
 
 
 
 
 
 
 
 
 
 
 
 
 
 

Physics journals
Publications established in 1893
English-language journals
American Physical Society academic journals
Academic journal series